An enclave is any portion of a state that is entirely surrounded by the territory of one other state. 

Enclave may also refer to:

Entertainment
 The Enclave, a 2002 film
 Enclave (comics), a group of villains in Marvel Comics
 Enclave (video game), a third-person 3D action game from Starbreeze Studios
 The Enclave, the remnants of the pre-war United States government in the Fallout video game series
 Enclave (film), a 2015 Serbian film

Other uses
 Enclave, a private region of computer memory in Software Guard Extensions
 Buick Enclave, an automobile
 Enclave (geology), an aggregate of minerals or rock found inside another larger rock body

See also
 Pirate enclave, a speculative view of early forms of autonomous proto-anarchist societies
 Ethnic enclave, a physical space with high ethnic concentration
 Lifestyle enclave, a sociological term coined by Robert N. Bellah for people who share some feature of private life
 Civil enclave, an area at a civil airport allotted to the armed forces
Military enclave, an area at a military air base allotted to civil operators
 Canton of Valréas, France, also known as the enclave des Papes